Raymond Maurice "Bill" White (1909–1972) was an English international badminton player.

Badminton career
White won the All England Open Badminton Championships, considered the unofficial World Badminton Championships, in men's singles twice, in 1933 and in 1935. He also won the Men's Doubles with Donald C. Hume for four consecutive years from 1932 to 1935 and the 1938 mixed doubles with Betty Uber.

He was part of the English touring team that visited Canada during 1930. A match was held at the Granite Club in Toronto which England won 7–2.

References 

Results of the All England

English male badminton players
1909 births
1972 deaths